The 1999–2000 Ball State Cardinals men's basketball team represented Ball State University as a member of the Mid-American Conference during the 1999–2000 NCAA Division I men's basketball season. Led by seventh-year head coach Ray McCallum, Ball State played their home games at Worthen Arena. The Cardinals finished atop the MAC West Division regular season standings. Ball State won the MAC tournament to receive an automatic bid to the NCAA tournament as No. 11 seed in the Midwest region. In the opening round, the Cardinals were beaten by No. 6 seed UCLA and finished the season with a 22–9 record (11–7 MAC).

Roster

Schedule and results

|-
!colspan=9 style=| Non-conference regular season

|-
!colspan=9 style=| MAC regular season

|-
!colspan=9 style=| MAC tournament

|-
!colspan=9 style=| NCAA tournament

Source

References

1999–2000 Mid-American Conference men's basketball season
1999-2000
1999 in sports in Indiana
2000 in sports in Indiana
2000 NCAA Division I men's basketball tournament participants